The 1992 Norwich City Council election'''''' took place on 7 May 1992 to elect members of Norwich City Council in England. This was on the same day as other local elections. 16 of 48 seats (one-third) were up for election, with one additional seat up due to the UK parliamentary by-elections in Henderson ward.

Results summary

Ward results

Bowthorpe

Catton Grove

Coslany

Crome

Eaton

Heigham

Henderson

Lakenham

Mancroft

Mile Cross

Mousehold

Nelson

St. Stephen

Thorpe Hamlet

Town Close

University

References 

1992 English local elections
1992
May 1992 events in the United Kingdom